Adamówka  is a village in the administrative district of Gmina Żółkiewka, within Krasnystaw County, Lublin Voivodeship, in Eastern Poland.

References

Villages in Krasnystaw County